Al-Qudaibiya Palace or Gudaibiya Palace is a palace in Gudaibiya, Manama, Bahrain. Located off Bani Otbah Avenue and Al Fatih Highway, it lies west of the Al Fateh Grand Mosque and southeast of the Old Palace of Manama and the Andalus Garden and Manama Cemetery. It is a light pink palace with a pearl-coloured, onion-shaped dome. For decades the palace has hosted some of the most important political and economy-related conferences in the country, having a prominent role in the foreign affairs of the country. The proclamation of the accession of Salman Al Khalifa, after his father's death in February 1942 was made from the steps of the Gudaibiya Palace,  read by the ruler's uncle, Shaikh Mohammad bin Isa. It has a major political function; the King's cabinet usually meets every Sunday at the palace and the Prime Minister has an office at the palace.

The landscaping of the Gudaibiya Palace  grounds was carried out, between September 2007 and September 2008, by the Ministry of Works.

References

External links
  View of Gudaibiya Palace, residence of the Prime Minister

Palaces in Bahrain
Buildings and structures in Manama